The White River Bridge in Elkins, Arkansas is a historic structure carrying County Road 44 over the White River in eastern Washington County. The bridge is a patented closed-spandrel arch design called the Luten arch, owned by the Luten Bridge Company of Knoxville, Tennessee, which emphasized strengthened piers and abutments, resulting in a reduced need for material. After construction in 1921, farmers in southeast Washington County were better able to bring their products to market in Elkins.

The bridge was listed on the National Register of Historic Places in 2008.

See also
National Register of Historic Places listings in Washington County, Arkansas
List of bridges on the National Register of Historic Places in Arkansas

References

Road bridges on the National Register of Historic Places in Arkansas
Bridges completed in 1921
National Register of Historic Places in Washington County, Arkansas
Concrete bridges in the United States
Arch bridges in the United States
Transportation in Washington County, Arkansas
White River (Arkansas–Missouri)
1921 establishments in Arkansas